Cnesterodon is a genus of poeciliids native to South America.

Species
There are currently 10 recognized species in this genus:
 Cnesterodon brevirostratus R. de S. Rosa & W. J. E. M. Costa, 1993
 Cnesterodon carnegiei Haseman, 1911
 Cnesterodon decemmaculatus (Jenyns, 1842) (Ten spotted live-bearer)
 Cnesterodon holopteros Lucinda, Litz & Recuero, 2006
 Cnesterodon hypselurus Lucinda & Garavello, 2001
 Cnesterodon iguape Lucinda, 2005
 Cnesterodon omorgmatos Lucinda & Garavello, 2001
 Cnesterodon pirai Aguilera, Mirande & Azpelicueta, 2009
 Cnesterodon raddai M. K. Meyer & Etzel, 2001
 Cnesterodon septentrionalis R. de S. Rosa & W. J. E. M. Costa, 1993

References

Poeciliidae
Fish of South America
Freshwater fish genera
Taxa named by Samuel Garman
Ray-finned fish genera